This Is... Icona Pop (also known as simply This Is...) is the second studio album and debut international album by Swedish duo Icona Pop, released on 24 September 2013 by Swedish independent record label TEN Music Group and Atlantic Records subsidiary Big Beat Records in the US. The album also includes the hit single "I Love It" which was also included on the band's Swedish-only self-titled debut album Icona Pop. On 16 September 2013, the album was made available to stream in full on the Pitchfork Media website. The album debuted at no. 36 on the Billboard 200 and fell to no. 136 in its second week.

Reception

This Is... received positive reviews from critics upon its release. The album scored a 69 out of 100 on review aggregator Metacritic based upon 22 reviews, indicating "generally favorable reviews". Under the Radar wrote that This Is "[is a] nurturing, exciting, and very intelligent debut." The A.V. Club described This Is... as "a refreshingly fun album with no pretenses, just plenty of sing-along hooks and dancefloor jams."

Track listing

Notes
  signifies a co-producer.
  signifies an additional producer.
  signifies a remixer.

Personnel
Credits for This Is... Icona Pop adapted from AllMusic.

Adis Adamsson – executive producer
Nicki Adamsson – vocal engineer
Matt Beckley – vocal engineer, vocal producer
Patrik Berger –  mixing, musician, producer, programming, vocal engineer, vocal producer
Amanda Bergman – background vocals
Tim Blacksmith – executive producer
Benny Blanco – musician, producer, programming
Charli XCX – featured artist, background vocals
Robert Cohen – engineer
Tom Coyne – mastering
Danny D. – executive producer
Rainer Davies – guitar
Matt Engelman – A&R
Mikkel Storleer Eriksen –  engineer, musician, programming
Emma Essinger – background vocals
Fredrik Etoall – photography
Read Fasse – keyboards, programming
Pete Ganbarg – A&R
Chris Gehringer – mastering
Serban Ghenea – mixing
Ross Golan –  vocals
Gene Grimaldi – mastering
Andrew Haas – guitar
Ola Håkansson – executive producer
Fransisca Hall –  background vocals
John Hanes – mixing engineer
Patrick Hart – keyboards
Tor Erik Hermansen –  musician, programming
Caroline Hjelt –  executive producer
Icona Pop – primary artist
Marisa Illo – marketing
Aino Jawo –  executive producer
Mark Knight –  producer
Kool Kojak – additional production,  keyboards
Markus Krunegård –  musician, producer, programming
Henke Larsson – A&R
Brian Lee –  musician, producer, programming
Colin Leonard – mastering
Rafi Levy – guitar
Tove Lo –  background vocals
Elof Loelv –  mixing, musician, producer, programming, vocal engineer, vocal producer, background vocals
Andrew Luftman – production coordination
Blake Mares – engineer
Robert Orton – mixing
Caweh Passereh –  producer
Noah Passovoy – engineer
Aryanna Platt – A&R
James Reynolds –  producer
Daniela Rivera – assistant engineer, engineer
Brian Robertson – bass
Jarrad "Jaz" Rogers –  musician, producer, programming
Chris Rude – keyboards
Nick Scapa –  keyboards, programming, background vocals
Chris Sclafani – assistant
Shellback –  keyboards, producer, programming, background vocals
Stargate – musician, producer, programming
Style of Eye – musician, producer, programming
Peter Svensson – additional production,  guitar
Phil Tan – mixing
Carolyn Tracey – package production
Virgilio Tzaj – art direction, design
Dane Vemble – marketing
Miles Walker – engineer
Johan Wedel – keyboards, producer, programming
Scott "Yarnov" Yarnovsky – production coordination

Charts

Release history

References

2013 albums
Icona Pop albums
TEN Music Group albums
Big Beat Records (American record label) albums
Atlantic Records albums
Electro house albums
Dance-pop albums by Swedish artists
European Border Breakers Award-winning albums